The Mancini Touch is a 1960 album by American composer and arranger Henry Mancini.

Reception

Greg Adams reviewed the album for Allmusic and wrote that "The result is a carefully arranged album on which the soloists occasionally improvise". "Free and Easy" written for the Sal Mineo film Rock, Pretty Baby "...speaks to his popular focus in spite of the jazz trappings" and "Bijou" anticipates "the sound of "Baby Elephant Walk" and "The Pink Panther Theme"" Adams felt that the depiction of Mancini on the cover of the album as a "puppeteer controlling dancers", anticipated the "development of Muzak in the late '60s" with the "belief in the power of music to manipulate mood and action".

The initial Billboard magazine review from January 25, 1960 commented that "Henry Mancini proves on this fine new album that he can do more than the music for "Peter Gun" with this very attractive big band waxing that could turn into another best-seller. The outstanding Mancini arrangements are played by the 35-piece ork with a sharpness and precision that is a pleasure to hear…The stereo sound is excellent”.

Track listing
 "Bijou" (Ralph Burns) – 3:11
 "Mostly for Lovers" (Henry Mancini, Paul Francis Webster) – 3:04
 "Like Young" (Andre Previn) – 3:15
 "My One and Only Love" (Robert Mellin, Guy Wood) – 3:16
 "Politely" (Mancini) – 3:18
 "Trav'lin' Light" (Johnny Mercer, Jimmy Mundy, Trummy Young) – 3:03
 "Let's Walk" (Mancini) – 3:06
 "Snowfall" (Claude Thornhill) – 3:40
 "A Cool Shade of Blue" (Mancini) – 3:47
 "Robbin's Nest" (Illinois Jacquet, Bob Russell, Sir Charles Thompson) – 3:40
 "Free and Easy" (Mancini) – 2:47
 "That's All" (Alan Brandt, Bob Haymes) – 3:07

Personnel
Henry Mancini – arranger, conductor
Armand Karpoff, Raphael Kramer, Edgar Lustgarten, Kurt Reher – cello
Shelly Manne – drums
John Cave, Vincent DeRosa, John Graas, Richard Perissi, Claude Sherry – flugelhorn
Bob Bain – guitar
John Williams – piano
Harry Klee, Ronnie Lang, Ted Nash – saxophone
Karl de Karske, Johnny Halliburton, Richard Taylor "Dick" Nash, Jimmy Priddy – trombone
Victor Feldman – vibraphone
Stanley Harris, Harry Hyams, Millton Thomas – viola
Samuel Cytron, Sam Freed, David Frisina, Benny Gill, Danny  Guglielmi, Mort Herbert, Sarah Kreindler, Dan Lube, William Miller, Erno Neufeld, Lou Raderman, Ambrose Russo, Felix Slatkin – violin
Production
Al Schmitt – engineer
Hal Levy – liner notes
Dick Pierce – producer

References

External links
 

1960 albums
Albums arranged by Henry Mancini
Instrumental albums
Henry Mancini albums
RCA Victor albums